No Sudden Move is a 2021 American neo-noir period crime thriller film directed, photographed and edited by Steven Soderbergh (the latter two roles under pseudonyms), produced by Casey Silver, and written by Ed Solomon. The film features an ensemble cast including Don Cheadle, Benicio del Toro, David Harbour, Jon Hamm, Amy Seimetz, Brendan Fraser, Kieran Culkin, Noah Jupe, Craig muMs Grant (in his final appearance), Julia Fox, Frankie Shaw, Ray Liotta, and Bill Duke. No Sudden Move had its world premiere at the Tribeca Film Festival on June 18, 2021, and was released in the United States on July 1, 2021, by HBO Max. The film received positive reviews from critics with praise for Soderbergh's direction and the performances of the cast.

Plot
In 1954 Detroit, Michigan, gangster Curt Goynes, in need of cash to leave town, is recruited to threaten a family as part of a blackmail scheme, along with gangsters Ronald Russo and Charley. The recruiter, Doug Jones, sends them to the house of GM accountant Matt Wertz, where they are to hold the family hostage while sending Wertz to the office where he works, to retrieve a document from his boss's safe. Finding it empty, a desperate Wertz brings fake documents to Jones, then returns home, where Charley prepares to execute the entire family, to the surprise of Goynes and Russo. Not wanting to be part of a massacre, Goynes shoots and kills Charley.

Jones phones the house, having discovered the documents are fake. He orders Goynes to kill Russo and the family, and Goynes realizes he and Russo have been set up. Before they leave, Goynes instructs the family to tell the police that Charley broke into their home and that Wertz killed Charley in self-defense. The police detective, Joe Finney, is skeptical of the family's story. Once the police leave, Goynes, Russo, and Wertz go to Wertz's boss's house in Ohio and retrieve the real document, which turns out to be plans for a new car part. Goynes and Russo discover they have a high bounty placed on their heads, and make plans to ascertain what the document is worth by arranging a meeting with Frank Capelli, the man whose wife Russo is having an affair with, and who is the mob leader who contracted the blackmail scheme. Meanwhile, Goynes makes further arrangements with mob leader Aldrick Watkins, with whom he has been on the outs, to clear himself by giving Watkins part of the eventual payment.

Goynes and Russo have a meeting with Capelli. Goynes deduces that the value of the document vastly exceeds the amount they considered it was worth. Jones arrives and points a gun, showing that he and Capelli have been planning to turn on Goynes and Russo. In the resulting shootout, Jones is killed. Capelli flees, only to be caught by Goynes and Russo, who extract the name of his contact: Naismith, a Studebaker executive. Goynes calls Naismith and arranges to sell him the document for $125,000. Capelli escapes, but when he returns home, his battered wife Vanessa shoots and kills him, and then departs with a suitcase full of cash. Seeking a bigger payday, Goynes and Russo return to Wertz's boss's home and make him call his contact further up the chain of command, arrogant automobile manufacturer's association executive Mike Lowen. Goynes and Russo meet with Lowen at a downtown hotel, where he pays them $375,000 to return the document. It is revealed to be plans for a catalytic converter. Lowen is seeking to conceal its existence from the public to avoid government pressure on the car companies to implement pollution controls.

After Lowen leaves, Goynes and Russo split the money but are interrupted by Goynes' associate, mob leader Watkins, and his men, who have already retrieved the $125,000 from Naismith. It initially seems that Goynes and Watkins may have teamed up to betray Russo, but Watkins' men lead Goynes away at gunpoint. Russo is allowed to leave with the $375,000. As Watkins and his men leave the hotel, they're stopped by Detective Finney and his policemen; Watkins bribes the detective with $50,000 of the Naismith money to let them leave with Goynes, saying that Goynes will be "taken care of." Russo flees the city with Vanessa, but when they leave the main road to avoid an apparent pursuer, she kills Russo and claims the money for herself. She is soon pulled over by a policeman, who takes the $375,000 as well as her 31,000 and then allows her to leave. Detective Finney, having retrieved the $406,000 from the cop, privately returns it to Lowen, along with the $50,000 bribe from Watkins. Watkins takes Goynes to a pier, but rather than "take care" of him, he makes amends with him. He offers Goynes a share of the remaining Naismith money, but Goynes wants only the $5,000 he originally contracted for, and is allowed to leave for Kansas City.

Cast

In addition, Matt Damon makes an uncredited appearance as Mike Lowen.

Production
It was announced in November 2019 that Steven Soderbergh would direct the film, then titled Kill Switch, with Josh Brolin, Don Cheadle, Sebastian Stan and John Cena in consideration to star. By March 2020, Jon Hamm and Cedric the Entertainer entered negotiations, with Brolin dropping out. In May 2020, it was announced Cheadle, Stan and Hamm were confirmed, with Benicio del Toro, Ray Liotta, Amy Seimetz, Frankie Shaw and George Clooney joining the cast.

Filming was due to begin on April 1, 2020, but was delayed as a result of the COVID-19 pandemic. Soderbergh stated he was hoping to restart in September. The film was retitled No Sudden Move, and began filming in Detroit on September 28, with David Harbour, Brendan Fraser, Kieran Culkin, Noah Jupe, Bill Duke and Julia Fox joining the cast, while actors Stan, Cena and Clooney departed due to production delays. In October, Matt Damon was added to the cast in a cameo role. Production wrapped on November 12.

The film was shot with Red Digital Cinema Monstro cameras and Kowa anamorphic lenses.

Release and reception
No Sudden Move had its world premiere at the Tribeca Film Festival on June 18, 2021. It was released on HBO Max on July 1, 2021. According to Samba TV, the film was watched by 567,000 households over its first four days.

The site's critics consensus reads, "While it may not be on par with his best crime capers, No Sudden Move finds Soderbergh on entertainingly familiar ground—and making the most of an excellent cast." According to Metacritic, which assigned a weighted average score of 76 out of 100 based on 38 critics, the film received "generally favorable reviews".

Richard Roeper of Chicago Sun-Times gave the film 3.5 out of 4 stars and wrote, "Another instantly immersive, richly layered and beautifully shot chapter in one of the most impressive directing careers of our time." Writing for The A.V. Club, Mike D'Angelo gave the film a "B+" grade, calling it a "twisty new caper" said: "Movies routinely place characters in desperate, life-or-death situations, but rarely do we see them behave in a genuinely desperate way. No Sudden Move, a period crime drama written by Ed Solomon and directed by Steven Soderbergh, corrects this oversight in a way that's at once hilarious and distressing."

References

External links
 

2021 crime thriller films
2020s heist films
American crime thriller films
American heist films
American neo-noir films
Film productions suspended due to the COVID-19 pandemic
Films directed by Steven Soderbergh
Films scored by David Holmes (musician)
Films set in 1954
Films set in Detroit
Films shot in Detroit
Films with screenplays by Ed Solomon
HBO Max films
Warner Bros. films
2020s English-language films
2020s American films